The 1876 Columbia football team represented Columbia University in the 1876 college football season.

Schedule

References

Columbia
Columbia Lions football seasons
Columbia football